The 2020–21 EuroCup Women was the nineteenth edition of FIBA Europe's second-tier international competition for women's basketball clubs under such name.

Teams
Teams were confirmed by FIBA Europe on 10 August 2020.

Schedule

Qualification round
Draw for the qualification round and the group stage was made on 17 August 2020 in Munich, Germany.

|}

Group stage
Draw for the qualification round and the group stage was made on 17 August 2020 in Munich, Germany.

Conference 1

Group A

Group B

Group C

Group D

Conference 2

Group E

Group F

Group G

Group H

Seeding
Results against fourth-placed teams were disregarded in all groups of four to rank the 16 qualified teams for the play-offs.

Playoffs

Bracket

See also
 2020–21 EuroLeague Women

References

External links
 EuroCup Women website

EuroCup Women seasons
2020–21 in European women's basketball leagues